Mettukudi is a 1996 Indian Tamil-language comedy film directed by Sundar C. starring Karthik, Gemini Ganesan, Goundamani, Nagma and Manivannan. The music was composed by Sirpy with cinematography by U. K. Senthil Kumar and editing by P. Sai Suresh. The film released on 29 August 1996 to positive reviews. The movie is based on the 1990 Malayalam movie His Highness Abdullah.



Plot
The story starts in the 9th century. King Raja Raja Chola presents his valuable sword to his commander-in-chief, for playing a vital role in winning a war. It was preserved by his family descendants. This information was known by an archaeologist, who plans to steal it due to its monetary value. Presently, Gemini Ganesan is charged with the care of the sword.

The villain plans to send Raja to do this job. He enters into the palace as the son (who ran off from the family in his childhood) of Kumarasamy, Gemini Ganesan's son-in-law. Initially, everything goes smoothly. However, Indhu, Gemini Ganesan's granddaughter, falls in love with Raja. The situation called for Raja to marry her. Later, Indhu discovers the truth and confronts him about stealing the sword.

In the meantime, Gemini Ganesan, not knowing Raja for what he came there for, gives the sword to him and asks him to look after it. This makes Raja realize his mistake and promises him to protect it. The climax occurs when Raja manages to protect the sword from the villain, and the family accepts Raja after learning the truth.

Cast

 Karthik as Rajasekhar
 Nagma as Indhu
 Gemini Ganesan as Indhu's grandfather
 Goundamani as Kalingarayan
 Manivannan as Kumarasamy, Gemini Ganesan's son-in-law
 Thilakan as Deivathinam
 Rajeev as Archaeologist 
 Uday Prakash as Deivathinam's son
 Vichu Viswanath as Archeologist's son-in-law 
 Kumarimuthu as Rajasekhar's adoptive father
 Kazan Khan as Deivathinam's son
 Kalaranjini as Sivagaami
 Kavitha as Kalingarayan's wife
 Halwa Vasu as Servant
 Nizhalgal Ravi (Guest appearance)
 Viswanathan
 Rageena

Soundtrack

References

External links
 Mettukudi Soundtrack at Music Plugin

1996 films
1990s Tamil-language films
Films directed by Sundar C.
Films scored by Sirpy
Tamil remakes of Malayalam films